Dialectica  is a quarterly  philosophy journal published by   Blackwell between 2004 and 2019. As of 2020, Dialectica is published in full open access. The journal  was founded in 1947 by Gaston Bachelard, Paul Bernays and Ferdinand Gonseth. Dialectica is edited in Switzerland and has a focus on analytical philosophy. The journal is the official journal of the European Society for Analytic Philosophy.

See also 
 Dialectica interpretation

External links
 Journal web site
 Issues published between 2004 and 2019 on Wiley Online Library

Philosophy journals
Analytic philosophy literature
Logic journals